Jérémy Vachoux (born 7 July 1994) is a French professional footballer who plays as a goalkeeper.

Career
On 26 January 2019, US Orléans announced that Vachoux would join the club on 1 July 2019. He signed a three-year contract with the club and got shirt number 30.

References

External links
Jérémy Vachoux at US Orléans' website

1994 births
Living people
Association football goalkeepers
French footballers
Ligue 2 players
Championnat National 2 players
Championnat National 3 players
RC Lens players
US Orléans players
USL Dunkerque players
People from Thonon-les-Bains
Sportspeople from Haute-Savoie
Footballers from Auvergne-Rhône-Alpes